Detroit's Frank Murphy Hall of Justice houses the Criminal Division of the Third Judicial Circuit of Michigan, also known as Wayne County Circuit Court, the Wayne County Prosecutor's Office and formerly housed Detroit Recorder's Court. Located in the Greektown district, the twelve-story Brutalist architecture building, designed by Eberle M. Smith, was completed in 1970 and is named for jurist and politician Frank Murphy, who was a Recorder's Court judge, Mayor of Detroit, Governor of Michigan, United States Attorney General and Associate Justice of the United States Supreme Court. , the building remained in use, but was slated for demolition as part of area redevelopment when the circuit court moves to a new Wayne County criminal justice campus.

References

Government buildings in Michigan
Buildings and structures in Detroit